= Atelothrus debilis =

Scientific classification
- Domain: Eukaryota
- Kingdom: Animalia
- Phylum: Arthropoda
- Class: Insecta
- Order: Coleoptera
- Suborder: Adephaga
- Family: Carabidae
- Genus: Atelothrus
- Species: A. debilis

Binomial name
- Atelothrus debilis Perkins, 1917

Species of beetle

Atelothrus debilis is a species of beetle first discovered in 1917. No sub-species are listed in the Catalogue of Life.
